Mehoopany is an unincorporated community in Wyoming County, Pennsylvania, United States. Mehoopany has a post office with ZIP code 18629.

References

Unincorporated communities in Wyoming County, Pennsylvania
Unincorporated communities in Pennsylvania